John Charles Besmehn (born 1964) from San Jose, California, is a writer, director, and producer of animated and live action shows, and a developer of toys and entertainment properties. He co-developed the toy line for Teenage Mutant Ninja Turtles, a multibillion-dollar comic book, animated television series and movie franchise, originally conceived by the comic book team, Kevin Eastman and Peter Laird.

He co-created the toy and animation property, B.C. Bikers, about a rogue band of "chrome age" dinosaurs who ride motorcycles through an apocalyptic past. Besmehn has also conceived, designed and written for such eclectic kid-fare as the Toxic Crusaders, based on the bizarre exploitive Troma feature film, The Toxic Avenger. He co-wrote with his collaborator, John Schulte, the animated pilot for the series Gormiti: The Invincible Lords of Nature, which debuted on Cartoon Network in 2009 and was based on the Italian toy collectible from Giochi Preziosi.

Besmehn writes and develops toy and entertainment properties with his longtime writing partners, John C. Schulte, Fred Fox Jr., and business associate, Cheryl Ann Wong. He is a co-founder and general partner in Pangea Corporation.

Biography

Early years
Besmehn was born in 1964 in San Jose, California, to Charles and Marion Besmehn. His father, Chuck, (b. 1935), was an engineer for Bechtel Corporation; his mother Marion (1936) holds a masters in Storytelling from Eastern Tennessee State University and has been recorded and published since the 1980s, recounting her tales of her homeland in Wales. Besmehn has two entrepreneurial brothers, Gregory (b. 1961), and Paul (b. 1970), who starred in the cult psychopathic classic, "Duck Duck Goose."

Education
Besmehn traveled extensively worldwide, receiving a broad liberal education as far away as Jakarta, Indonesia and as provincial as Edmonton, Alberta, Canada and Houston, Texas. He attended San Mateo College and Glendale College, studying theatre, law and computer programming.

Career
Following his college days, Besmehn toured with an international theatre company, which became the foundation for David Houck's renaissance effort of resuscitating the Pasadena Playhouse. Besmehn filmed productions and performed in short films during this time and eventually met up with his long-time collaborator, John C. Schulte, whilst developing a reality-based series, "The Perfect Wedding." Besmehn's career as a performer ranged from stage appearances in regional theatre to pivotal roles in Hollywood blockbuster franchises, like  A Nightmare on Elm Street 3: Dream Warriors, where he played opposite Zsa Zsa Gabor and Dick Cavett, and appeared in B-movie fare such as Invasion: Earth, and Return to Horror High.

Besmehn had a number of intellectual properties optioned by DIC Entertainment, the animation studio famous for the Inspector Gadget series. DIC retained Besmehn and his company to serve as an elite development team. There he developed concepts and series ideas, including ones for Arsenio Hall's Chunky A character and New Kids on the Block.

Besmehn pursued the fusion of design, product development and writing to create toy lines and animated shows, such as Speed Racer, Zorro, Biker Mice from Mars, The Mask, Mirmo, Toonsylvania, The Mummy, Penguins of Madagascar, and a host of others. Besmehn also created innovative interactive products, designing the logic and content for such breakthrough dolls as Amazing Ally from Playmates, virtual pets like Tamagotchi and Nano, and the character-based robot, Brian the Brain. The interactive storytellers, Yano, Wittley and Bubba are among his credits.

During the emergence of internet entertainment, Besmehn established a kid-centric community on America Online (Toy Network) and Apple's eWorld (ToyNet); the destination published "toytainment", so kids could get wind of the current new crop of shows and toys coming their way. As a programmer, Besmehn also created the visionary debut sites for many toy and entertainment companies, including Bandai.com, SpeedRacer.com, WhacAMole.com and sundry others.

Besmehn is the director and editor of the award-winning video for kids called "Yoga Divas". He has turned his hands-on approach most recently toward the development of new and original intellectual properties, though he continues to develop programs based on licensed entertainment, through his association with studios such as DreamWorks, Universal Studios, and Sony.

Besmehn collaborates with songwriter, performer and record producer Ron Dante on his new musical; he is co-writing with Edgar Award Winning author Barbara Brooks Wallace on a show based on her Miss Switch book series. With his business partner John Schulte, they started writing, designing and developing a new animated series based on secondary characters from the anime series, Speed Racer.

References

External links

 PANGEA Corporation

1964 births
Living people
American male screenwriters
American directors
American film producers